The 2017 Liga 3 North Maluku is the third edition of Liga 3 North Maluku as a qualifying round for the national round of 2017 Liga 3. Persiter Ternate are the defending champions.

Teams
Only 3 clubs participated in the league in this season.

Group stage
This stage scheduled starts on 9 July 2017 and finish 27 July 2017. The winner of group stage will represent North Maluku region in national round of 2017 Liga 3.

All matches will be held in Gelora Kie Raha Stadium, Ternate.

Final
Because of the points and head-to-head between Persiter Ternate and Persihalbar West Halmahera is similar, so the final stage is held.

Champions

References 

2017 in Indonesian football
North Maluku